Soumyen Bandyopadhyay is an architect and architectural historian at Liverpool University where he was head of department and holds the Sir James Stirling Chair in Architecture. He has previously held professorial positions at the Manchester School of Architecture (MSA) and Nottingham Trent University.

His research focuses on the historical, theoretical and contextual approaches to architectural design and the art and architecture of India and the Middle East. He undertakes advisory and consultancy work in urban development, regeneration, architectural and urban design and conservation.

Education
Born and brought up in Kolkata, he attended Kanailal Vidyamandir. Bandyopadhyay secured first position in first class in the Bachelor of Architecture (BArch) from the Bengal Engineering College, Shibpur under the University of Calcutta in 1983. He did his Masters of Architecture (MArch) by Research in the University of Liverpool in 1991, his master's thesis was on India's Urban Housing Problem and the Role of Revitalisation.  Bandyopadhyay earned his PhD from the University of Liverpool in 1998, where his doctoral research was on Manah: Architecture, Archaeology and Social Structure of a Deserted Omani Settlement

Career

Architectural career
Bandyopadhyay currently holds the Sir James Stirling Chair and is head of the Liverpool School of Architecture. He has previously held professorial positions at Manchester School of Architecture and Nottingham Trent University. Bandyopadhyay began his architectural career as a Trainee Architect in the Central Public Works Department of the Government of India in Kolkata in 1982. After a year he moved to Saha and Associates, architectural consultant of Calcutta, as an architect. He also worked briefly for I.M. Asthana (architectural consultants). In 1985 he moved to Muscat, Sultanate of Oman, and joined Jabrin Engineering Consultancy Bureau as Architect-in-Charge. In Oman, Bandyopadhyay also worked for Valtos Oman as Senior Architect. In 1990 he moved to the United Kingdom for further study, since then he been in academia and undertakes advisory and specialist consultancy works.

Academic career

Roles
 External Examiner, MA (Thinking Building), University of Kingston
 Advisor, Conservation and Interpretation of Qasr Al Husn Palace, Abu Dhabi. Government of Abu Dhabi (with Austin Smith Lord, UK)
 Director, India in the World Research Centre (IWRC), University of Liverpool
 External Examiner, Graduate Diploma in Architecture, University of Kingston
 External Assessor, Bachelor of Architecture Programme, University of Lincoln
 Advisor and contributor, Muscat Urban Renewal, Muscat Municipality and The Palace Office, Government of the Sultanate of Oman
 Advisor, Ceremonial Route, The Palace Office, Government of the Sultanate of Oman
 Advisor and contributor, Development and Conservation of Harat al Aqr (Nizwa), Ministry of Regional Municipalities, Government of the Sultanate of Oman
 Advisor and contributor, Management Plan for Bahla Fort and Oasis World Heritage Site (UNESCO inscription 1987 C-iv), UNESCO and Ministry of Heritage and Culture, Government of the Sultanate of Oman
 Advisor and contributor, Conservation of the National Heritage Site of Harat al Bilad (Manah), Ministry of Heritage and Culture, Government of the Sultanate of Oman
 Member of review panel, Global Built Environment Review (GBER)
 Member of review panel, International Development Planning Review (IDPR)
 Listed as an expert on Omani traditional architecture and settlements, International Oman Studies Centre, Germany
 Visiting Design Critic in graduate and undergraduate design program. Institutions include, Nottingham University, Kingston University, Manchester Metropolitan University, Leeds Metropolitan University, University of Washington: Seattle
 Member of review panel, Hong Kong Papers in Design and Development (University of Hong Kong)
 Invited Member, Projects Committee, Merseyside Civic Society, Liverpool

Publications

Books
 
 Bandyopadhyay, S & Temple, N (2009) Arresting Architecture: Bridging Research and Academic Design. Liverpool University Press, Liverpool
 Bandyopadhyay S & Jackson, I (2009) Nek Chand's Rock Garden. Phaidon/ MIT, London
 Bandyopadhyay, Soumyen (2008) Omani Mihrab-s: Origin and Evolution. Ministry of Awqaf and Religious Affairs, Muscat
 Bandyopadhyay, Soumyen (2008) Manah: The Architecture of an Omani Settlement. Historical Association of Oman, Muscat
 
 Bandyopadhyay, Soumyen (2001) Manah: A Gift of God, The Architecture of a Deserted Omani Settlement. Historical Association of Oman., Muscat

Book chapters
 Bandyopadhyay, S., TEMPLE, N., LOMHOLT, J. and TOBE, R., 2010. [Introduction] . In: Bandyopadhyay, S., Temple, N., Lomholt, J. and Tobe, R., eds., The humanities in architectural design. London : Routledge, pp. xiv–xxi. 
 Bandyopadhyay, S., 2008. From another world! A possible Buyid origin of the decorated 'Mihrab' of central Oman? In: Olijdam, E., ed.  Intercultural relations between South and Southeast Asia, studies in commemoration of E.C.L. during Caspers (1934–1966). Oxford : Archaeopress vol. 1826, pp. 372–382. 
 Bandyopadhyay, S., 2007. The foreigner, situated moments and topographic healing . In: Bandyopadhyay, S. and Temple, N., eds., Reflections on architectural research and building work. London : Black Dog Publishing, pp. 58–75. 
 Bandyopadhyay, S., 2007. [Conclusion] . In: Bandyopadhyay, S. and Temple, N., eds., Reflections on architectural research and building work. London : Black Dog Publishing, pp. 184–186. 
 Bandyopadhyay, S., 2007. [Introduction] . In: Bandyopadhyay, S. and Temple, N., eds., Reflections on architectural research and building work. London : Black Dog Publishing, pp. 4–13. 
 Bandyopadhyay, S., 2006. Interpretation of heritage sites and assessing cultural significance: the enclosed 'Zara' of Harat al-Bilad (Manah Oasis) .  Conservation of earthen structures in the Arab states. Grenoble : UNESCO World Heritage Centre; CRATerreENSAG., pp. 75–87. 
 Bandyopadhyay, S. and TEMPLE, N., 2006. Contemplating the unfinished: architectural drawing and the fabricated ruin . In: Frascari, M., ed.  From models to drawings: imagination and representation in architecture. London : Taylor & Francis/ Routledge, pp. 109–119. 
 Bandyopadhyay, S., 2005. Problematic aspect of synthesis and interpretation in the study of traditional Omani built environment . In: Shakur, T., ed.  Cities in transition: transforming the global built environment. Altrincham : Open House Press, pp. 15–30. 
 Bandyopadhyay, S., 2005. Diversity in unity: an analysis of settlement structure of Harat al-'Aqr, Nizwa (Oman) .  Proceedings of the seminar for Arabian studies. vol. 35, pp. 19–36. 
 Bandyopadhyay, S., 2005. The deconstructed courtyard: dwellings of Central Oman . In: Edwards, B., ed.  Courtyard housing: past, present and future. Abingdon; New York : Taylor & Francis, pp. 109–121. 
 Bandyopadhyay, S., 2004. Harat al-Bilad (Manah): glimpses of a complexity of ideas and concepts . In: Al, Taie, H., ed.  Pride. Muscat : Al Roya, pp. 54–58. 
 Bandyopadhyay, S. and SIBLEY, M., 2003. The distinctive typology of central Omani mosques: its nature and antecedents .  Proceedings of the seminar for Arabian studies. vol. 33, pp. 99–116. 
 Bandyopadhyay, S., AHMED, Y. and YEOMANS, D., 2002. Conservation of world heritage cities in Asia and the Pacific: the changing scope of heritage since the Venice Charter 1964 .  2nd Post-Graduate Conference Proceedings. University of Salford . 
 Bandyopadhyay, S., KNIGHT, M., BERRIDGE, P. and BROWN, A., 2001. Digital hindcasting: critical analysis through virtual reconstruction .  eCAADe19: architectural information management. , pp. 529–533. 
  Bandyopadhyay, S., 2001. Deserted and disregarded: the architecture of Bilad Manah in central Oman .  Archéologie Islamique. vol. 10, pp. 131–168. 
 Bandyopadhyay, S., 2000. Manah: the deserted enchantress . In: Al, Zakhwani, S., ed.  Tribute. Muscat : Apex, pp. 161–176. 
 Bandyopadhyay, S., 2000. From the twilight of cultural memory: the 'Bumah' in the mosques of central Oman .  Proceedings of the seminar for Arabian studies. vol. 30, pp. 13–25. 
 Bandyopadhyay, S., 1998. Iconography, ideogram and the 'Intentio Auctoris': the recent work of Charles Correa .  Invocations of tradition in pedagogy. Berkeley : University of California Press vol. 113, pp. 17–42. 
 Bandyopadhyay, S., 1996. Representation of the cultural palimpsest: the case of Manah in Oman, with special reference to the relationship of water to the places of worship .  Multiple voices/contested representations: imagery and identity. Berkeley : University of California Press vol. 83, pp. 1–38. 
 Bandyopadhyay, S., 1994. Affordability: some recent findings from the Indian scene .  Proceedings of the second symposium on housing for the urban poor: housing, poverty and developing countries. European Network on Housing Research (ENHR) . 
 Bandyopadhyay, S., 1994. The deserted village of Manah: an Ibadi-Omani settlement: a brief description of settlement pattern and dwellings . In: Cockburn, C., ed.  Architecture and planning in the developing world. University of York, pp. 37–43. 
 Bandyopadhyay, S., 1994. Settlement planning and housing in modern Oman: a climatologically appropriate solution?  Buildings and the environment. Watford; Rotterdam : Central Institute of Building (CIB), Nederland & Building Research Establishment (BRE) . vol. EP10 
 Bandyopadhyay, S., 1993. Housing and modern built environment in Oman . In: Elgohary, A., ed.  Proceedings of the 10th inter-schools conference on development. University College London, pp. 43–54. 
 Bandyopadhyay, S., 1992. Housing and settlement development in present-day Oman: energy issues and comfort conditions .  Proceedings of the 20th IAHS world congress on housing. Birmingham; Miami : International Association of Housing Science (IAHS) vol. 2, pp. 1–18. 
 Bandyopadhyay, S., 1992. Rethinking progress: the case of Oman, an investigation into its built environment .  Housing, squatter communities and tradition. Berkeley : University of California Press vol. 51, pp. 1–38.

Notes

References

Academics of Nottingham Trent University
British architectural historians
Indian emigrants to England
Living people
Year of birth missing (living people)
Place of birth missing (living people)
University of Calcutta alumni
Indian architects
British architects
Naturalised citizens of the United Kingdom
Academics of the University of Liverpool